Johnson is a hamlet in Orange County, New York, United States. Johnson has a post office with ZIP code 10933.

References

Hamlets in Orange County, New York
Hamlets in New York (state)